Tobey Maguire is an American actor and producer. He gained international prominence for his role as Peter Parker / Spider-Man in the Spider-Man trilogy, which was directed by Sam Raimi, as well as the Marvel Cinematic Universe film Spider-Man: No Way Home. In 2003, he was nominated for a Saturn Award for Best Actor for his role in Spider-Man, but had lost to Robin Williams for One Hour Photo, and in 2005, he won the award for his role in Spider-Man 2. He is also known for acting in Babylon, Brothers, The Great Gatsby, Seabiscuit, and The Cider House Rules. He has also done voice overs in Cats & Dogs and The Boss Baby.

Film

Television

Video games

References

American filmographies
Male actor filmographies